Empress Lü (呂雉, 241–180 BC), of the Han dynasty, was the first empress in Chinese history.

Empress Lu or Empress Lü may also refer to:

 Empress Lü (Houshao) (呂皇后, died 180 BC), wife of Emperor Houshao of Han
 Empress Lu (Liu Song dynasty) (路皇后, fl. 465), wife of Emperor Qianfei of Liu Song
 Empress Lu (Tang dynasty) (陸皇后, fl. 710), wife of Emperor Shang of Tang

Lu